Jeecimilson "Jessi" de Assunção Lima Tati (born 16 April 1991) is a Santomean footballer who plays as a forward for Pampilhosa and São Tomé and Príncipe national team.

International career
Tati made his professional debut with the São Tomé and Príncipe national team in a 2–1 2021 Africa Cup of Nations qualification win over Mauritius on 24 March 2021.

References

External links
 
 
 

1991 births
Living people
People from São Tomé
São Tomé and Príncipe footballers
São Tomé and Príncipe international footballers
Portuguese footballers
Portuguese people of São Tomé and Príncipe descent
Association football forwards
G.D. Tourizense players
Campeonato de Portugal (league) players
São Tomé and Príncipe expatriate footballers
São Tomé and Príncipe expatriates in Portugal
Expatriate footballers in Portugal